The Galloway School is a private school in Atlanta, Georgia, United States. It was founded by Elliott Galloway in 1969 and preschool through grade 12.

History 
In 1969, Elliott Galloway, his wife Kitty and his friend Ross Arnold founded The Galloway School. Galloway had served in the U.S. Navy during World War II and the Korean War, and later taught at the Westminster Schools and served as principal of Westminster Middle School. He was named headmaster at Holy Innocents in 1965. The Galloway School opened its doors in 1969 to 380 students; the first class graduated in 1971.

Martin Luther King III was among the first students. King enrolled after he was denied admission at The Lovett School due to his race.

Notable alumni 
 Amanda Doherty - professional golfer
 Martin Luther King III - activist

References

External links 

 Official website

Private K-12 schools in Atlanta
1969 establishments in Georgia (U.S. state)
Educational institutions established in 1969